Acentrogobius dayi, the Day's goby, is a species of goby found in the Western Indian Ocean from the Persian Gulf to Pakistan.

Size

Etymology
The fish is named in honor of Francis Day (1829-1889),  the Inspector-General of Fisheries in India,

References

Gobiidae
Taxa named by Frederik Petrus Koumans
Fish described in 1941
Fish of the Indian Ocean